RJC may refer to:

 Raffles Junior College, now known as Raffles Institution (Junior College), a school in Singapore
 Republican Jewish Coalition, a political lobbying group in the United States advocating Jewish support for the Republican Party
 Responsible Jewellery Council, an international not-for-profit organisation established to reinforce consumer confidence in the jewellery industry 
 Riverside Junior College, a former name of the Riverside City College in Riverside, California, United States
 Roda JC, a Dutch football club playing in the Eredivisie
 Rosthern Junior College, a high-school in Rosthern, Saskatchewan